Willis Smith (December 19, 1887June 26, 1953) was an American attorney and Democratic U.S. senator from the state of North Carolina between 1950 and 1953.

Early life and education
Born in Norfolk Virginia, he moved to North Carolina before age 2. After graduating from Trinity College (now the undergraduate liberal arts college of Duke University) in 1910 and Duke University Law School in 1912, he became a practicing attorney—but interrupted his work to serve in the United States Army during World War I. In 1912, he founded the law firm that eventually became known as Smith, Anderson, Blount, Dorsett, Mitchell & Jernigan (informally "Smith Anderson").

Political career
Smith served in the North Carolina House of Representatives from 1927 to 1932, and was briefly the speaker of that body in 1931.  He also served as a U.S. observer at the Nuremberg Trials in 1946, as chairman of the American delegation to the Inter-Parliamentary Union in Bern, Switzerland in 1952, as chairman of the Duke University board of trustees (1947 - 1953), and as president of the American Bar Association (1945-1946).

In the Democratic primary of 1950, Smith defeated incumbent Sen. Frank Porter Graham for the nomination. Graham had been appointed to fill the vacancy caused by the death of J. Melville Broughton and had served only a little over a year at the time of his defeat. In a campaign distinguished by race-baiting, Graham, who was well known for his antiracist sympathies, was supported by President Harry Truman and the state's liberal Democratic faction, while Smith was aided by a young strategist named Jesse Helms.

Smith's service in the Senate was brief and unremarkable.

Death 
He died due to coronary thrombosis in 1953 in Bethesda, Maryland and was interred at the Historic Oakwood Cemetery in Raleigh, North Carolina.

See also
 List of United States Congress members who died in office (1950–99)

References

Speakers of the North Carolina House of Representatives
Democratic Party members of the North Carolina House of Representatives
Duke University Trinity College of Arts and Sciences alumni
Duke University School of Law alumni
North Carolina lawyers
1887 births
1953 deaths
Burials at Historic Oakwood Cemetery
Democratic Party United States senators from North Carolina
20th-century American politicians
Old Right (United States)